= Tommy Chan =

New Zealand storekeeper, market gardener, and landowner

Tommy Chan (1889–19 July 1969) was a New Zealand storekeeper, market gardener and landowner. He was born in Canton, China in 1889.
